Woodcliff, New Jersey may refer to:

 Woodcliff, North Bergen, a neighborhood
 former name of Woodcliff Lake, New Jersey